Plot or Plotting may refer to:

Art, media and entertainment
 Plot (narrative), the story of a piece of fiction

Music
 The Plot (album), a 1976 album by jazz trumpeter Enrico Rava
 The Plot (band), a band formed in 2003

Other
 Plot (film), a 1973 French-Italian film
 Plotting (video game), a 1989 Taito puzzle video game, also called Flipull
 The Plot (video game), a platform game released in 1988 for the Amstrad CPC and Sinclair Spectrum
 Plotting (non-fiction), a 1939 book on writing by Jack Woodford
 The Plot (novel), a 2021 mystery by Jean Hanff Korelitz

Graphics
 Plot (graphics), a graphical technique for representing a data set
 Plot (radar), a graphic display that shows all collated data from a ship's on-board sensors
 Plot plan, a type of drawing which shows existing and proposed conditions for a given area

Land
 Plot (land), a piece of land used for building on
 Burial plot, a piece of land a person is buried in
 Quadrat, a defined area of land used for an ecological study

Other uses
 Robert Plot (1640–1696), English naturalist

See also
 Motion planning, a term used in robotics for the process of detailing a task into atomic motions
 Plotting board, a mechanical device to track a target and project its future position
 Conspiracy (disambiguation)
 Plotter (disambiguation)
 Plat, a map